Joseph Vivian Wilson (1894–1977) was a notable New Zealand public servant and diplomat, and the New Zealand ambassador to France. He was born in Greendale, North Canterbury, New Zealand in 1894.

In 1953, Wilson was awarded the Queen Elizabeth II Coronation Medal.

References

1894 births
1977 deaths
New Zealand public servants
Ambassadors of New Zealand to France
People from Greendale, New Zealand